Shapurdukhtak (Middle Persian: Šābuhrduxtag, literally "daughter of Shapur"), also known as Shapurdukhtak II, was a Sasanian queen (banbishn) in the late 3rd and early 4th-centuries, who was the wife of the Sasanian king (shah) Narseh. She has been suggested to be the daughter of shah Shapur I, however, this is disputed.

She is mentioned in the inscription at Ka'ba-ye Zartosht written in c. 262. She held the title of sagan banbishn ("Queen of the Saka"), due to her husband Narseh serving as governor of Sakastan at that time. When Narseh ascended the throne in 293, he had an investiture relief made in Naqsh-e Rostam, where he is depicted as receiving the ring of kingship from a female figure that is frequently assumed to be the goddess Anahita. However, some scholars have suggested that this may be his queen, Shapurdukhtak.

References

Sources 
 
  
 
 

3rd-century Iranian people
4th-century Iranian people
4th-century deaths
3rd-century births
Sasanian queens